John Alexander Fincher (27 November 1904 – 4 October 1970) was an Australian rules footballer who played for Richmond and Footscray in the Victorian Football League (VFL).

Family
One of the nine children (six boys and three girls) of George Francis Fincher (1865–1959),  and Margaret Lawrence Fincher (c.1866–1956), née Nicoll, John Alexander Fincher was born in Lauriston, Victoria on 27 November 1904.

His elder brother Charlie played at South Melbourne, and was killed in the very first landings at Gallipoli on 25 April 1915.

Football
Fincher was unlucky not to play in a premiership side while at Richmond, appearing in three successive losing Grand Finals from 1927, his debut season. A rover, he kicked 23 goals in 1928. He crossed to Footscray in 1931, a year before Richmond broke through for their premiership.

Death
He died at Mount Beauty, Victoria on 4 October 1970.

Footnotes

References
 Holmesby, Russell and Main, Jim (2007). The Encyclopedia of AFL Footballers. 7th ed. Melbourne: Bas Publishing.
 Hogan P: The Tigers Of Old, Richmond FC, (Melbourne), 1996.

External links

 
 
 Jack Finscher, at Boyles Football Photos.

1904 births
Richmond Football Club players
Western Bulldogs players
Australian rules footballers from Victoria (Australia)
1970 deaths